The following lists events that happened during 1991 in Somalia.

Incumbents
 President: Siad Barre (until 26 January), Ali Mahdi Muhammad (starting 26 January)
 Prime Minister: Muhammad Hawadle Madar (until 24 January), Umar Arteh Ghalib (starting 24 January)

Events

January
 January 26 - Siad Barre is overthrown, causing Somalia to enter a civil war, which would later turn into a war against Islamists.
 January 29 - Siad Barre is succeeded by Ali Mahdi Muhammad as President of Somalia.

February

May
 May 18 - Somaliland withdraws from Somalia.

References

 
1990s in Somalia
Years of the 20th century in Somalia
Somalia
Somalia